Les Hôtels Baverez is a French luxury hotel group established in 1900.

History 
Managed by the same family since 1900, Les Hôtels Baverez is a hotel group that runs three 5-star establishments in Paris. Constant Baverez was the associate of Léonard Tauber, founder of the Regina (1900), Majestic (1908), and Raphael (1925).

His son Paul Baverez followed in his footsteps, and so did his daughter Françoise Baverez. She is currently the chair of the board of directors of the group. Her daughter, Véronique Valcke, is the executive director of all three hotels since 2010.

Hôtel Regina 

Inaugurated in 1900 for the World's Fair in Paris, Hôtel Regina is situated on the Place des Pyramides, which takes its name from Napoleon’s victory in Egypt in 1798. The hotel is in a building dating back to the Second Empire. Léonard Tauber and his associate Constant Baverez built it between 1898 and 1900. The Regina was named after Queen Victoria, symbolizing the Entente Cordiale between the French and the British.

The first phase of renovation to the hotel was completed in the summer of 2014. The renovations of the second wing, which started in October 2014, were inaugurated on 29 September 2015. The cost estimate for the renovations is 17 million euros. In November 2014, Mr. Piazzi was appointed as the new director, and in August 2015, the hotel received its fifth star from the Atout France agency.

Majestic Hôtel-Spa 

The Majestic Hôtel-Spa is located at 30 rue La Pérouse in the 16th arrondissement of Paris. The original Hôtel Majestic was built by Léonard Tauber and opened in 1908 as the second hotel of what is now the Baverez group. It was located on the other side of rue La Pérouse in the building that is now known as The Peninsula Paris hotel. That building was purchased by the French government in 1936 to serve as offices for the Ministry of War.

The building at 30 rue La Pérouse was inaugurated in February 2010 under the name of Hôtel Majestic Villa. The name was subsequently changed to Majestic Hôtel-Spa.

Hôtel Raphael 

Hôtel Raphael is a 5-star hotel in the 16th arrondissement of Paris. It was built in 1925 by Léonard Tauber and Constant Baverez, based on the plans of architect André Rousselot. The hotel has Art Deco style decorations and was named after the painter Raphael. Hollywood actors such as Ava Gardner, Katharine Hepburn, Charles Bronson, Yul Brynner, Henry Fonda, Clark Gable, Grace Kelly, Burt Lancaster, Steve McQueen, Roger Moore, Kirk Douglas, Gary Cooper and Marlon Brando were regular guests. During the German occupation of Paris the hotel was the principle billet for senior officers of the SS, Gestapo and Wehrmacht. The famed German author Ernst Junger was resident at the Raphael and wrote many of the entries for his war journals within its confines.

References

External links 
 

Hotels in Paris